Marek Margoc is a paralympic athlete from Slovakia competing mainly in category F40 shot put events.

Biography
Margoc has twice competed in the shot put in the Paralympics.  His first appearance came in 2004 Summer Paralympics where he won the gold medal, unfortunately he could not defend his title and missed out on a medal

References

Paralympic athletes of Slovakia
Athletes (track and field) at the 2004 Summer Paralympics
Athletes (track and field) at the 2008 Summer Paralympics
Paralympic gold medalists for Slovakia
Living people
Medalists at the 2004 Summer Paralympics
Year of birth missing (living people)
Paralympic medalists in athletics (track and field)
Slovak male shot putters